Pickering Township is a civil township in Bottineau County in the U.S. state of North Dakota. Its population was 193 as of the 2010 census, down from 213 at the 2000 census.

History
Pickering Township was organized sometime between 1910 and 1920 from Vinge School Township and the western portion of Bottineau School Township.

Reportedly, in 1883, Norwegian settlers from Polk County, Minnesota, established the first Norwegian settlement in Bottineau County near Carbury in present-day Pickering Township. Other Norwegians followed in 1886.

Geography
Pickering Township is located in Township 162N, Range 76W. North Dakota Highway 14 is a primary highway in the township, and the city of Bottineau, which is the county seat, is located in the southeast corner of the township.

It is managed by the North Dakota Game and Fish Department.

References

Townships in Bottineau County, North Dakota
Populated places established in 1883
1883 establishments in Dakota Territory
Townships in North Dakota